Futbol Club San Rafael Cedros Municipal are a Salvadoran professional football club based in San Rafael Cedros, El Salvador.

Recent history
 Tercera Division: 1997–2010
 Segunda División: 2011–

Coaches
 Samuel Arias (2011)
   German Rodriguez   (Jan 2016–)
 Ernesto Carrillo Interim (June 2016 – July 2016)
 Victor Giron (July 2016–)

External links
 Club Deportivo San Rafael Cedros :: Estadísticas :: Títulos :: Títulos :: Historia :: Goles :: Próximos Partidos :: Resultados :: Noticias :: Vídeos :: Fotos :: Plantilla :: ceroacero.es

Football clubs in El Salvador
Association football clubs established in 2015
2015 establishments in El Salvador